Amblyptila strophanthina is a moth of the family Gracillariidae. It is known from South Africa.

The larvae feed on Strophanthus species. They mine the leaves of their host plant. The mine has the form of a moderate, irregularly rounded or oval, transparent blotch-mine.

References

Endemic moths of South Africa
Acrocercopinae
Moths described in 1961
Moths of Africa